The Gale Storm Show is an American sitcom starring Gale Storm. The series premiered on September 29, 1956, and ran until 1960 for 125 half-hour black-and-white episodes, initially on CBS and in its last year on ABC. Its title is also seen as The Gale Storm Show: Oh, Susanna.

The Gale Storm Show was produced initially by Hal Roach Studios. The Roach company later sold the program to Independent Television Corporation.

The series was aired under the title Oh, Susanna in syndication.

Synopsis
The series is based on a cruise director, Susanna Pomeroy (Storm), on a ship traveling around the world. A cast of regular characters inhabits the ship and new situations are created as the ship moors in ports. Unlike her previous role on My Little Margie, Storm's character emits a shrill, two-fingered whistle to get people's attention. On her previous show, she would make a Trilling sound when in trouble.

The series finished at No. 16 in the Nielsen ratings for the 1957–1958 season.

Cast
 Gale Storm as Susanna Pomeroy
 ZaSu Pitts as Elvira Nugent
 Roy Roberts as Captain Huxley
 James Fairfax as Cedric

Notable guest stars
Pat Boone
Francis De Sales
William Frawley
Lorne Greene
Ron Hagerthy as Sergeant Rickie Hayland in "Wedding at Sea" (1959)
Rodolfo Hoyos, Jr.
Boris Karloff
Peggy Knudsen
Doug McClure
Patrick McVey as Reid in "Girls! Girls! Girls!" (1957)
Robby the Robot
Frank Wilcox
Robert Warwick

Episodes

Season 1 (1956–57)

Season 2 (1957–58)

Season 3 (1958–59)

Season 4 (1959–60)

Award nominations

References

External links

 

1956 American television series debuts
1960 American television series endings
1950s American sitcoms
1960s American sitcoms
1960s American workplace comedy television series
American Broadcasting Company original programming
Black-and-white American television shows
CBS original programming
English-language television shows
Television series by ITC Entertainment
Nautical television series